Budu (Jawi: بودو; ,) is an anchovies sauce and one of the best known fermented seafood products in Kelantan and Terengganu in Malaysia, the Natuna Islands (where it is called  or ), South Sumatra, Bangka Island and Western Kalimantan in Indonesia (where it is called rusip), and Southern Thailand. It is mentioned in A Grammar and Dictionary of the Malay language, With a Preliminary Dissertation, Volume 2, By John Crawfurd, published in 1852.

History
It is traditionally made by mixing anchovies and salt in a ratio ranging from 2:1 to 6:1 and allowing the mix to ferment for 140 to 200 days. It is used as a flavouring and is normally eaten with fish, rice, and raw vegetables.

The fish product is the result of hydrolysis of fish and microbial proteases. The flavor and aroma of budu are produced by the action of proteolytic microorganisms surviving during the fermentation process. Palm sugar and tamarind are usually added to promote a browning reaction, resulting in a dark brown hue. The ratio of fish to salt is key to the final desired product. Different concentrations of salt influences the microbial and enzymatic activity, resulting in different flavours. The microorganisms found during budu production are generally classified as halophilic. The microorganisms play important roles in protein degradation and flavour and aroma development.

Budu is a traditional condiment among the ethnic Malays of east coast of Peninsular Malaysia, particularly in the state of Kelantan and Terengganu. Budu has been declared a Malaysian heritage food by the Malaysian Department of National Heritage. Even ethnic Chinese in Kelantan are involved in budu production. Anchovy and its products like budu are high in protein and uric acid, thus not recommended for people with gout. The uric acid content in anchovies, however, is lower than that in tuna.

Budu made from anchovy sauce has shown potential as an anti-cancer agent. As a food sourced from fish it also has potential as brain food.

A powdered form of budu was developed by a Politeknik Kota Bharu (PKB) student in 2011. This allows for easier storage and transport as it is lighter and less prone to bottle breakage.

See also

References

External links
  Kehebatan budu Kelantan
 The Unique Cina Kampung, The Star online

Malaysian condiments
Malay cuisine
Fish sauces
Umami enhancers
Kelantan
Dried fish
Anchovy dishes